Şabanözü District is a district of the Çankırı Province of Turkey. Its seat is the town of Şabanözü. Its area is 467 km2, and its population is 11,657 (2021).

Composition
There is one municipality in Şabanözü District:
 Şabanözü

There are 18 villages in Şabanözü District:

 Bakırlı 
 Bulduk 
 Bulgurcu 
 Büyükyakalı 
 Çapar 
 Çaparkayı 
 Çerçi 
 Göldağı 
 Gündoğmuş 
 Kamışköy 
 Karahacı 
 Karakoçaş 
 Karamusa 
 Küçükyakalı 
 Kutluşar 
 Martköy 
 Ödek 
 Özbek

References

Districts of Çankırı Province